Flamingo/Lummus (often called either Flamingo or Lummus) is an urban neighborhood of South Beach in the city of Miami Beach, Florida, United States. Named for the famed Flamingo Hotel of the early 20th century, it is located in the eastern portion of the main island the city occupies.  It is roughly bound by Lincoln Road to the north, 5th Street to the south, Biscayne Bay and Alton Road to the west, and Ocean Drive and Lummus Park to the east.

Gallery

References

Neighborhoods in Miami Beach, Florida